Sandy Hyslop (born 30 May 1964) is a former Australian rules footballer who played with Collingwood in the Victorian Football League (VFL).

Hyslop was a half back flanker, originally from Eltham, where he was a premiership player in 1982.

His only league game came in Collingwood's Round 16 win over Fitzroy at Waverley Park in the 1986 VFL season.

He had a stint in the Victorian Football Association with Brunswick, but would return to Eltham and win a best and fairest in 1991.

References

1964 births
Australian rules footballers from Victoria (Australia)
Collingwood Football Club players
Eltham Football Club players
Brunswick Football Club players
Living people